Priyadarsika is a Sanskrit play attributed to king Harsha (606 - 648). It was first translated into English by G. K. Nariman, A. V. Williams Jackson, and Charles J. Ogden and published by the Columbia University Press in 1923 as the tenth volume of the 13 volume Columbia University Indo-Iranian Series (1901–32).

See also
 List of Sanskrit plays in English translation
 Ratnavali
 Nagananda

References

External links
Priyadarsika, translated by G. K. Nariman and A. V. Williams Jackson

Ancient Indian literature
Sanskrit texts
7th-century plays
7th-century Indian books
Sanskrit plays